Dimitar Rangelov (Bulgarian: Димитър Рангелов; born 9 February 1983) is a Bulgarian professional footballer who plays as a forward for German NOFV-Oberliga Süd club VfB Krieschow.

He made his debut for Bulgaria in 2004.

Career

Slavia Sofia
Born in Sofia, Rangelov started playing football in local team Slavia. On 3 June 2000, then 17 years old, he made his official debut in professional football in a match against Beroe Stara Zagora as a 65th-minute substitute. Rangelov played for PFC Slavia Sofia between 2000 and 2006.

Strasbourg
Rangelov was sold to RC Strasbourg for €1 million. In 2007, he was loaned for six months to German side FC Erzgebirge Aue. After that, he was loaned again to Energie Cottbus and quickly developed into an important first team player at his new team.

Energie Cottbus
After a half season on loan, Rangelov signed for FC Energie Cottbus. For Energie Cottbus, he earned 49 appearances playing in the Bundesliga, scoring 15 goals.

Borussia Dortmund
On 16 June 2009, Rangelov officially signed his contract with Borussia Dortmund. The transfer fee was 1 million €. His contract is for four years. On 20 March 2010, he scored his first goal in the Bundesliga for the Dortmund side in the 3–0 home win against Bayer Leverkusen.

Maccabi Tel Aviv (loan)
On 4 September 2010 Borussia Dortmund loaned him to Maccabi Tel Aviv until the end of the season with purchase option in the end. On 6 November 2010, Rangelov scored his first goal for Maccabi in the match against Hapoel Ashkelon. In April 2011 with the end of regular season (before the playoffs). Rangelov reached a mutual agreement on his release from Maccabi and his return to his original club Dortmund.

Return to Energie Cottbus (loan)
On 28 June 2011, Rangelov re-joined Energie Cottbus where he played between 2007 and 2009, signing a one-year loan deal. Rangelov ended the season in 2. Bundesliga with 12 goals to his name making him Energie's top scorer.

Luzern
On 11 July 2012, Rangelov joined Swiss Super League side FC Luzern on a two-year contract for an undisclosed fee, though media reports estimated it to be between €300,000 and £350,000. Four days later, he made his debut in a 1–1 home draw against FC Zürich, playing the full 90 minutes. On 11 August Rangelov netted his first goal, scoring a penalty against St. Gallen. He scored his first-ever European goal on 23 August, opening the scoring in a 2–1 home win over Genk in their Europa League play-offs first leg tie. A week later, in the second leg tie against Genk, Rangelov was sent off  in the 37th minute.

Third Energie Cottbus stint
In October 2018, Rangelov joined Energie Cottbus for the third time in his career having signed a contract until the end of the season. As of 2019, he is the only Bulgarian to have scored at four different levels of the German league system.

Return to Slavia Sofia
After nearly 15 years playing abroad Rangelov returned to his childhood club PFC Slavia Sofia by signing a contract with the club in July 2020.

Career statistics

Club

International

Scores and results list Bulgaria's goal tally first, score column indicates score after each Rangelov goal.

References

External links
 
 
 
 
 

1983 births
Living people
Footballers from Sofia
Association football wingers
Association football forwards
Bulgarian footballers
Bulgaria international footballers
Bulgarian expatriate footballers
PFC Slavia Sofia players
RC Strasbourg Alsace players
FC Erzgebirge Aue players
FC Energie Cottbus players
Borussia Dortmund players
Maccabi Tel Aviv F.C. players
FC Luzern players
Konyaspor footballers
Ümraniyespor footballers
First Professional Football League (Bulgaria) players
Ligue 2 players
Bundesliga players
Israeli Premier League players
2. Bundesliga players
3. Liga players
Regionalliga players
Süper Lig players
TFF First League players
Swiss Super League players
Expatriate footballers in France
Expatriate footballers in Germany
Bulgarian expatriate sportspeople in Germany
Expatriate footballers in Israel
Expatriate footballers in Switzerland
Expatriate footballers in Turkey